The 2019 24H Middle East Series is the first season of the 24H Middle East Series, presented by Creventic. The races are contested with GT3-spec cars, GT4-spec cars, 24H-Specials cars, along with LMP2 cars, LMP3 cars and Group CN prototype cars.

Calendar

Teams and drivers

Race results
Bold indicates overall winner.

References

External links

24H Middle East Series
Middle East Series
Motorsport competitions in the United Arab Emirates
2019 in Emirati motorsport